Vilmos Énekes (28 February 1915 – 7 December 1990) was a Hungarian boxer.

He won the gold medal in the Flyweight division at the 1937 European Amateur Boxing Championships in Milan.

Vilmos was the younger brother of István Énekes.

1915 births
1990 deaths
Flyweight boxers
Boxers from Budapest
Hungarian male boxers